Clint Alfino (born 7 August 1968, in Cape Town) is a South African baseball player. Alfino competed for South Africa at the 2000 Summer Olympics, where he appeared in 1 game as the designated hitter (DH) and 5 games as the left fielder, going 2–14 in his plate appearances with one run scored.

References

1968 births
Living people
Sportspeople from Cape Town
South African baseball players
Olympic baseball players of South Africa
Baseball designated hitters
Baseball players at the 2000 Summer Olympics